Mogi-Guaçu Biological Reserve is a biological reserve located in the state of São Paulo, Brazil.

The reserve is in the Martinho Prado Junior district of the municipality of Mogi Guaçu. It holds a research centre that investigates ecology, taxonomy, population genetics, physiology, biochemistry and other subjects.

Winters, from April to September, are dry.

Ecology

The reserve contains one of the few remnants of cerrado in São Paulo State. Vegetation includes cerrado, riparian forests and fields.

It includes endangered species such as Aristolochia labiata, Eriotheca pubescens and the palms Acanthococos emensis and Euterpe edulis.
Fauna include cougar (Puma concolor), giant anteater (Mymercophaga tridactyla), maned wolf (Chrysocyon brachyurus), black-collared hawk (Busarellus nigricollis) and red-winged tinamou (Rhynchotus rufescens). The black-fronted titi (Callicebus nigrifrons) occurs in the reserve.

Notes

Sources

Protected areas established in 1942
Protected areas of São Paulo (state)
Biological reserves of Brazil
1942 establishments in Brazil